The knockout stage of the 2005 FIFA Confederations Cup began on 25 June and concluded on 29 June 2005 with the final at the Waldstadion, Frankfurt. It was the second and final stage of the 2005 FIFA Confederations Cup, following the group stage. The top two teams from each group (four teams in total) advanced to the knockout stage to compete in a single-elimination style tournament. A third-place match was included and played between the two losing teams of the semi-finals.

In the knockout stage (including the final), if a match was level at the end of 90 minutes, extra time of two periods (15 minutes each) would be played. If the score was still level after extra time, the match would be decided by a penalty shoot-out.

Qualified teams

Bracket
{{Round4-with third

|25 June – Nuremberg||2||3
|26 June – Hanover||1 (5)| (pen.)|1 (6)|29 June – Frankfurt||4||1

|29 June – Leipzig| (aet)|4||3
}}

Semi-finals

Germany v BrazilMan of the Match:Adriano (Brazil)Assistant referees:Cristian Julio (Chile)
Mario Vargas (Chile)Fourth official:Peter Prendergast (Jamaica)

Mexico v Argentina
Mexico vs Argentina took place on 26 June 2005 at the AWD-Arena in Hanover. Both sides had chances to convert during normal time, with Mexico having the most ball possession and chances during the first half. The first chance arrived for Mexico in the third minute, with defensive midfielder Rafael Márquez having a chance from a corner caused by central midfielder Jaime Lozano, which went wide. A few minutes later, fellow central midfielder and captain Pável Pardo had another opportunity, a direct shot from the corner to force Argentine goalkeeper Germán Lux into making a save. During the end of the first half, Argentina also started producing chances, such as central forward Luciano Figueroa missing out on a cross by central midfielder Juan Román Riquelme, as well as Riquelme himself having his shot over inside the goal, and Javier Saviola assisting Juan Pablo Sorín after getting past the Mexican defence, with Sorín nearly gifting Argentina and the match its opening goal, having attempted to chip past Mexican goalkeeper Oswaldo Sánchez, before centre-back Gonzalo Pineda narrowly rescued off the line. During the second half, it was Argentina who started to find their form, with Argentina rounding up chances, all in four minutes. However, Mexico eventually managed to find their form, such as Zinha firing a shot, which hit the right post. During the near conclusion of the second half, both Saviola and Márquez were sent off, with Saviola kicking Pineda and Márquez for a tackle on replacement midfielder Pablo Aimar, which affected both sides' chances of progressing to the final. The match had to be decided in extra time. The first goal of the match came for Mexico in the 104th minute, with left-back Carlos Salcido scoring after the ball had hit centre-back Fabricio Coloccini. However, six minutes later, Argentina equalised through centre-forward Luciano Figueroa, in which he rounded Sánchez. No further goals were scored, and the match had to be decided by a penalty shoot-out. Argentina scored all of their six penalties, with right-back Ricardo Osorio missing his spot kick after it was saved by Lux. This meant Argentina won the match and advanced to the final, with Mexico qualifying for the third-place play-off. The penalty shoot-out was the first ever held in the FIFA Confederations Cup history.Man of the Match:Javier Zanetti (Argentina)Assistant referees:Alessandro Griselli (Italy)
Cristiano Copelli (Italy)Fourth official:Matthew Breeze (Australia)

Third place play-offMan of the Match:Michael Ballack (Germany)Assistant referees:Matthew Cream (Australia)
Jim Ouliaris (Australia)Fourth official:Carlos Chandía (Chile)

Final

The 2005 FIFA Confederations Cup Final was held at Waldstadion, Frankfurt, Germany on 29 June 2005. The match was contested by Brazil and Argentina. Both Brazil (after 1997 and 1999) and Argentina (after 1992 and 1995, then known as the King Fahd Cup) made their third performance in a Confederations Cup final. Brazil won their second Confederations Cup title.Man of the Match:Ronaldinho (Brazil)Assistant referees:Roman Slyško (Slovakia)
Martin Balko (Slovakia)Fourth official:'''
Peter Prendergast (Jamaica)

References

External links
  (archived)

Knockout
2004–05 in German football
2004–05 in Mexican football
2004–05 in Argentine football
knock